Carl Anton Larsen (7 August 1860 – 8 December 1924) was a Norwegian-born whaler and Antarctic explorer who made important contributions to the exploration of Antarctica, the most significant being the first discovery of fossils for which he received the Back Grant from the Royal Geographical Society. In December 1893 he became the first person to ski in Antarctica on the Larsen Ice Shelf which was subsequently named after him. In 1904, Larsen re-founded a whaling settlement at Grytviken on the island of South Georgia. In 1910, after some years' residence on South Georgia, he renounced his Norwegian citizenship and took British citizenship. The Norwegian whale factory ship  was named after him.

Early life 

Carl Anton Larsen was born in Østre Halsen, Tjolling, the son of Norwegian sea captain Ole Christian Larsen and his wife Ellen Andrea Larsen (née Thorsen). His family subsequently relocated to nearby Sandefjord, the home of the Norwegian whaling industry, where at the young age of 9 he went to sea in a small barque with his father chasing seals and trading across the North Atlantic with Britain, returning to go to school during the fall and winter. He continued this for a number of years, until his curiosity for the sea was so strong he enrolled himself in navigation school where he passed the exam for foreign-going mate at the age of 18. Having been to Britain a few times in the previous years he realized the importance of knowing more languages and taught himself English and Spanish.

Larsen was eager to get work as an officer on a ship, but due to economic difficulties in Norway at the time, he could not achieve that. This was a setback, but he went to work at sea as a cook, learning the importance food played in keeping men happy.

He finally got a position aboard the barque Hoppet out of Larvik, as second mate, then first mate and senior officer below the captain. He was 21 and knew he had to study again so he came ashore and soon became a shipmaster.

Upon becoming a shipmaster, Larsen needed a ship of his own. This was more than he could afford so instead he bought a share of an old barque called the Freden. It was not smooth sailing for Larsen as the barque Freden was all but wrecked after his first voyage. He soon got her fixed, only to be faced with another setback: nobody had any freight he could carry. This turned out to be a stroke of luck as he decided to go on his first whaling experience, hunting bottlenose whales just off the coast of Norway. Larsen was a born whaler and soon filled the Freden with whales and went on filling her until 1885 when he realized that he could not use the Svend Foyn gun with little chaser-steamers like the modern whalers. It was time for a newer ship.

Expeditions to Antarctica 

Larsen led an expedition to Antarctica, in command of the Jason, from 1892 through 1894, discovering the Larsen Ice Shelf, the Foyn Coast in Graham Land, as well as King Oscar Land, and Robertson Island. The Jason was a ship Larsen was familiar with as he had been aboard it during the voyage that carried Fridtjof Nansen to Greenland during his east–west crossing in 1888.

Later he captained the ship Antarctic, as part of the Swedish Antarctic Expedition of 1901–04. During this mission some of his crew wintered for 10 months at Snow Hill Island, and after his ship was crushed by ice and sank, he and his crew spent the winter of 1903 on Paulet Island, surviving on penguins and seals before being rescued by the Argentine corvette ARA Uruguay.

Larsen and South Georgia 

In 1904, Larsen settled on the British island of South Georgia in the Antarctic, starting a new era of whaling. On Christmas Eve, 1904, he produced the first whale oil of the season in the newly built whaling station of Grytviken. With capital from Argentine, Norwegian and British sources, he founded the first Antarctic whaling corporation, the Compañía Argentina de Pesca (Argentine Fishing Company). Within a few years the Antarctic was producing about 70% of the world's whale oil.

Larsen had chosen the whaling station's site during his 1902 visit while in command of the ship Antarctic of the Swedish Antarctic Expedition (1901–03) led by Otto Nordenskjöld. Larsen organized the construction of Grytviken ― a remarkable undertaking accomplished by a team of 60 Norwegians. As with other buildings, a church was pre-built in Norway and erected in Grytviken. This typical Norwegian-style church was consecrated as a Church of Norway church, on Christmas Day, 1913. In 1922, the funeral service for Sir Ernest Shackleton was conducted in the church before his burial in the church cemetery. Larsen established a meteorological observatory at Grytviken, which from 1905 was maintained in cooperation with the Argentine Meteorological Office under the British lease requirements of the whaling station until these changed in 1949. Larsen was also instrumental, with his brother, in introducing Reindeer to South Georgia in 1911, as a resource for recreational hunting for the people involved in the whaling industry.

Larsen, like other managers and senior officers of the South Georgia whaling stations, lived in Grytviken together with his family including his wife, three daughters and two sons. In 1910, they obtained British citizenship, following an application filed with the British Magistrate of South Georgia in which Larsen declared: "I have given up my Norwegian citizens rights and have resided here since I started whaling in this colony on 16 November 1904 and have no reason to be of any other citizenship than British, as I have had and intend to have my residence here still for a long time."

See also 
 Larsen Harbour
 Viktor Esbensen
 Carl Julius Evensen
 Bristol Island
 Montagu Island
 Robertson Island
 Seymour Island
 Thule Island
 History of South Georgia and the South Sandwich Islands

References

Books

Footnotes

External links 

Captain Carl Anton Larsen
Whaling Ship C A Larsen
Whaling stations of Grytviken, Leith Harbor, and Stromness Harbor
Exploration of the Antarctic 
Norwegian Antarctic Territory

People from Sandefjord
Norwegian sailors
Explorers of Antarctica
Norwegian polar explorers
Norwegian people in whaling
History of South Georgia
South Orkney Islands
Norwegian emigrants to the United Kingdom
People from Larvik
British Antarctic Territory
1860 births
1924 deaths
Graham Land
Naturalised citizens of the United Kingdom
South Georgia and the South Sandwich Islands people
Sea captains
Whaling in Antarctica
Sportspeople from Vestfold og Telemark